Sludge is a semi-solid slurry that can be produced from a range of industrial processes, from water treatment, wastewater treatment or on-site sanitation systems. For example, it can be produced as a settled suspension obtained from conventional drinking water treatment, as sewage sludge from wastewater treatment processes or as fecal sludge from pit latrines and septic tanks. The term is also sometimes used as a generic term for solids separated from suspension in a liquid; this soupy material usually contains significant quantities of interstitial water (between the solid particles). Sludge can consist of a variety of particles, such as animal manure.

Industrial wastewater treatment plants produce solids that are also referred to as sludge. This can be generated from biological or physical-chemical processes.

In the activated sludge process for wastewater treatment, the terms "waste activated sludge" and "return activated sludge" are used.

In food processing and beverage-making industries, sludge can have high protein content and other nutrients that can be used for beneficial purposes such as animal feed, thereby avoiding disposal at a landfill.

References

Environmental engineering
Sanitation
Sewerage